Ultisols, commonly known as red clay soils, are one of twelve soil orders in the United States Department of Agriculture soil taxonomy. The word "Ultisol" is derived from "ultimate", because Ultisols were seen as the ultimate product of continuous weathering of minerals in a humid, temperate climate without new soil formation via glaciation. They are defined as mineral soils which contain no calcareous (calcium carbonate containing) material anywhere within the soil, have less than 10% weatherable minerals in the extreme top layer of soil, and have less than 35% base saturation throughout the soil. Ultisols occur in humid temperate or tropical regions. While the term is usually applied to the red clay soils of the Southern United States, Ultisols are also found in regions of Africa, Asia, and South America.

In the World Reference Base for Soil Resources (WRB), most Ultisols are known as Acrisols and Alisols. Some belong to the Retisols or to the Nitisols. Aquults are typically Stagnosols or Planosols. Humults may be Umbrisols.

Introduction 

Ultisols vary in color from purplish-red, to a bright reddish-orange, to pale yellowish-orange and (in cooler areas such as Pennsylvania) even some subdued yellowish-brown or grayish-brown tones. They are typically quite acidic, often having a pH of less than 5. The red and yellow colors result from the accumulation of iron oxide (rust), which is highly insoluble in water. Major nutrients, such as calcium and potassium, are typically deficient in Ultisols, which means they generally cannot be used for sedentary agriculture without the aid of lime and other fertilizers, such as superphosphate. They can be easily exhausted, and require more careful management than Alfisols or Mollisols. However, they can be cultivated over a relatively wide range of moisture conditions.

Ultisols can have a variety of clay minerals, but in many cases the dominant mineral is kaolinite. This clay has good bearing capacity and no shrink–swell property. Consequently, well-drained kaolinitic Ultisols such as the Cecil series are suitable for urban development.

Ultisols are the dominant soils in the Southern United States (where the Cecil series is most famous), southeastern China, Southeast Asia, and some other subtropical and tropical areas. Their northern limit (except fossil soils) is very sharply defined in North America by the limits of maximum glaciation during the Pleistocene, because Ultisols typically take hundreds of thousands of years to form—far longer than the length of an interglacial period today.

The oldest fossil Ultisols are known from the Carboniferous period when forests first developed. Though known from far north of their present range as recently as the Miocene, Ultisols are surprisingly rare as fossils overall, since they would have been expected to be very common in the warm Mesozoic and Tertiary paleoclimates.

Gardening in Ultisol 
The lack of organic matter in Ultisol makes it difficult for plants to grow without proper care and considerations. Soil amendments are generally required each year in order to sustain plant life in regions with primarily Ultisol soil. The use of soil tests, coupled with the corresponding provisions, can alleviate issues of nutrition and irrigation that can result from non porous Ultisol. Soil tests help indicate the pH, and red clay soil typically has a low pH. The addition of lime is used to help to increase the pH in soil and can help increase the pH in Ultisol as well.

Clay soil is known to retain nutrients very well because its negative charge helps to attract cations. As a result, Ultisol does not often require the high amounts of fertilizer additions other types of soils often do. However, this retention of nutrients coincides with a lack of water filtration that may subject plants to highly saturated soil.

Possible solutions 
Generally, gardeners aim to have 45% mineral, 5% organic matter and 50% pore space in their soil. The composition of Ultisol in North Carolina, for reference, is approximately 16% pore space, 2% organic matter and 82% mineral. The use of mulch is widespread in the Piedmont region of the United States as a solution to the high temperatures and saturation of the soil. The addition of mulch helps to make the soil more porous.

Adding manure and/or compost can help to boost the amount of organic material present in the soil which in turn helps to add essential nutrients. Specifically, the addition of a 2- to 3-inch layer of compost and/or manure should be mixed into the soil to approximately match the depth of a shovel.  The addition of organic material also helps to improve the drainage, while decreasing the overall weight of the soil.

However, microorganisms in the soil consume the same nutrients that plants use to grow so certain nutrients will remain unavailable to plants until the microorganisms completely break down the organic material and release nutrients. Living organisms within the soil use, and subsequently convert, organic material into usable humus. To avoid the delay presented by this process, adding manure in the fall is advisable. 

Some gardeners who live in areas with large amounts of red clay soil use raised beds or Hügelkultur to avoid having to amend the soil. By using raised beds, gardeners avoid having to deal with Ultisols altogether.

Best plants for Ultisol 
When choosing what to plant in Ultisol, plants found native to regions with high amounts of Ultisol are able to thrive. Generally these are species adapted to poorly drained, damp soils. The Missouri Botanical Garden recommends tickweed, spotted jewelweed, mealycup sage, Camassia, spring starflower, ostrich fern, sideoats grama, Bouteloua curtipendula, and prairie dropseed.

Suborders
 Aquults: Ultisols with a water table at or near the surface for much of the year
 Humults: well-drained Ultisols that have high organic matter content
 Udults: Ultisols of humid climates
 Ustults: Ultisols of semiarid and subhumid climates
 Xerults: temperate Ultisols with very dry summers and moist winters

See also
 Pedogenesis
 Pedology (soil study)
 Soil classification
Red Soil

References

 
 
 

Pedology
Types of soil